M. A. Jalil (known as AJ) is a Bangladeshi businessman, actor, director and producer. He started his professional career as a businessman in 1999, while he encashed his meme fame and began his film career with Khoj: The Search in 2010. Jalil was awarded CIP (Commercially Important Person) status in 2014 for his contributions in RMG sector of Bangladesh.

Early life and background
In 1999 he started his profession as a Production general manager. Later he set up his small garment factory which further grown up to AJI Group year by year. He was awarded CIP (Commercially Important Person) status in 2014 for his contributions in RMG sector.

Ananta made his debut as an actor and producer with the 2010 film Khoj: The Search. The film headlined the debut of Ananta and Barsha, Bobby. Khoj: The Search was followed by Hridoy Bhanga Dheu in 2011.

In 2012, he appeared in two films, The Speed and Most Welcome. Both the films were comedic success and gave him access to the local crowd of Bangladeshi cinema. In The Speed, Ananta starred opposite to two foreign actresses, Malaysian actress Parveen and Russian actress Nana. The 2nd release Most Welcome was released on Eid.

In 2013 his only release was Nishwartha Bhalobasa. The film marked the directorial debut of Ananta. He tried his alleged talent with the story, dialogue, screenplay and lyric of a song of this film. It was premiered at 66th annual Cannes Film Festival. The film was a comedic success. In 2014 Most Welcome 2 was released, the sequel of his 2012 film Most Welcome. Producer and actor Ananta Jalil's Din–The Day helmed by Iranian director Morteza Atashzamzam, was released on Eid al-Adha, July 10, 2022.

Ananta is the brand ambassador of Grameenphone, a telecommunications service provider in Bangladesh.

Personal life
Ananta married model-turned-actress Afiea Nusrat Barsha on 23 September 2011. Barsha is the managing director of Monsoon Films. Together they have two sons, Ariz Ibn Jalil and Abrar Ibn Jalil. News of Ananta & Barsha's divorce got viral in 2013. Though, later they came to an understanding and started living together as couple. In 2019, they celebrated their eighth anniversary in Italy.

Filmography

Awards and nominations

References

External links 

 
 

Living people
People from Dhaka
Bangladeshi businesspeople
Bangladeshi male film actors
Bangladeshi film directors
21st-century Bangladeshi male actors
Year of birth missing (living people)